Teterino is a rural locality (a selo) in Seletskoye Rural Settlement, Suzdalsky District, Vladimir Oblast, Russia. The population was 35 as of 2010. There are 2 streets.

Geography 
Teterino is located 22 km north of Suzdal (the district's administrative centre) by road. Torchino is the nearest rural locality.

References 

Rural localities in Suzdalsky District